Nehro Mohammed Abdul-Karim Kasnazan is an Iraqi politician who led the Iraq Assembly of National Unity (now the Coalition for Iraqi National Unity) electoral coalition.

He was one of the few politicians from the Sunni Arab community to participate in the  Iraqi legislative election of January 2005. The slate put up 275 candidates but won no seats.

References 

Iraq Assembly of National Unity politicians
Living people
Year of birth missing (living people)